Gurrieri is an Italian surname. Notable people with the surname include:

Andres Gurrieri (born 1989), Argentine footballer
Kyle Gurrieri (born 1998), American soccer player

See also
Guerrieri

Italian-language surnames